As of Summer 2022, AlbaStar operates the following routes:

References

AlbaStar